April Daniels is an American author of the Nemesis superhero trilogy.

Personal life and education 

Daniels lived in Ashland, Oregon until she was ten years old, where she was exposed to the Oregon Shakespeare Festival, before her family moved to Los Angeles, California. She was homeless in San Francisco for a time, and currently lives in Portland, Oregon. She graduated from the University of California, Santa Cruz with a degree in literature. Daniels is a trans woman. Daniels is also a contributor to The Mary Sue.

Nemesis series 

Daniels' first book, Dreadnought, introduces a girl named Danny Tozer who inherits the mantle of her world's foremost superhero—the eponymous Dreadnought—which gives her powers like flight and the feminine body she has wanted ever since she realized she was transgender, and thrusts her into confrontation with a trans-exclusionary radical feminist (TERF) witch and other supervillains. It was a Lambda Literary Award finalist.

Daniels' second book, Sovereign, introduces a genderqueer superhero named Kinetiq, continues to explore the moral and mental health implications of Danny's fights with villains, and has her file for emancipation from her abusive family and find love.

A third and final installment in the Nemesis series is currently in development.

In 2018, the series was optioned for film to Wayne Brady's production company, Makin' It Up Productions.

Bibliography

Nemesis series 

 Dreadnought (2017) – 
 Sovereign (2017) –

Awards

Notes

References 

Living people
Year of birth missing (living people)
American women novelists
LGBT people from Oregon
Transgender women
21st-century American novelists
21st-century American women writers
People from Ashland, Oregon
21st-century LGBT people
American transgender writers